Phil Lollar (born August 6, 1959) is an American voice actor, director, producer and writer for the Focus on the Family-created radio drama, Adventures in Odyssey. He is credited as being one of the show's creators. He also provided the voice for one of characters from the show, Dale Jacobs. He also worked on the Jungle Jam and Friends: The Radio Show!, the Little Dogs on the Prairie videos and Big Idea's 3-2-1 Penguins! series. He is currently a script supervisor for Paws and Tales and is developing a project called Iliad House.

Career 
Phil started his performing career at the age of five. He won numerous acting awards in high school, and studied music, screenwriting and directing in college. Phil then worked with Focus on the Family, co-creating the Adventures in Odyssey series and writing more than 250 episodes. Phil also co-developed the hit comedy series Jungle Jam and Friends: The Radio Show! as well as the animated video series Little Dogs on the Prairie. Phil also served as a writer and consultant for the television series, The Wubbulous World of Dr. Seuss. He also voiced Mr. Small, Mr. Strong, and Mr. Lazy on the US version of The Mr. Men Show, as well as serving as the casting director.

Personal life 
Lollar lives in California with his wife Leslie. His son no longer lives with him at home.

Written works of Phil Lollar 
This is a list of books or other written works by Phil Lollar.

Adventures in Odyssey – (with Paul McCusker), Lillenas Pub Co, 
Adventures in Odyssey Radio Scripts (with Paul McCusker), Lillenas Pub Co, 
At the Cross: Dramatic Resources for the Easter Season – 
The Complete Guide to Adventures in Odyssey – Tyndale House Pub, 
The Great Train Set Robbery – Thomas Nelson Inc, 
Little Dogs on the Prairie: Yippee Ti-Yay, Happy Birthday Book, STL, 
Welcome to Odyssey – Hardcover, Tyndale House,

Voice work

The Mr. Men Show: Mr. Small (US), Mr. Lazy (US) and Mr. Strong (US)
The Uglydoll Show: Trunko and Wage
The Jungle Book: Hathi
Hi Hi Puffy AmiYumi: Wacky Wally
Space Racers: Dodo, Headmaster Crane
Adventures in Odyssey: Additional Voices
Olivia: Additional Voices
Jungle Jam and Friends: The Radio Show!: Millard J. Monkey & others
Roary the Racing Car: Loada (US)

Casting Director
The Mr. Men Show
Hi Hi Puffy AmiYumi

Voice Director
Olivia

References

External links
 Full list of works and credits
 

1959 births
Living people
Adventures in Odyssey
American casting directors
American male voice actors
American radio producers
American radio writers
People from Klamath Falls, Oregon
American voice directors